Graphium decolor is a butterfly found in the Philippines and Sabah, Malaysia, that belongs to the swallowtail family.

Subspecies
G. d. decolor (Philippines: Balabac, Calamian, Palawan) 
G. d. atratus (Rothschild, 1895) (Philippines: Mindoro)
G. d. neozebraica Page, 1987 (Philippines: Bohol, Leyte, Luzon, Marinduque, Masbate, Negros, Panaon, Panay, Polillo, Samar, Siquijor, Ticao) 
G. d. sibuyana Page, 1987 (Philippines: Sibuyan) 
G. d. tigris (Semper, 1892)
G. d. rebeccae (Page & Treadaway, 2003) (Philippines: Camiguin de Luzon) 
G. d. jamesi (Page & Treadaway, 2003) (Philippines: Sibutu, Sanga Sanga)

References

Page M. G.P & Treadaway,C. G.  2003 Schmetterlinge der Erde, Butterflies of the world Part XVII (17), Papilionidae IX Papilionidae of the Philippine Islands. Edited by Erich Bauer and Thomas Frankenbach Keltern: Goecke & Evers; Canterbury: Hillside Books.

External links
External images

Butterflies described in 1888
decolor
Butterflies of Asia
Taxa named by Otto Staudinger